Insyde Software is a company that specializes in UEFI system firmware and engineering support services, primarily for OEM and ODM computer and component device manufacturers. They are listed on the Gre Tai Market of Taiwan and headquartered in Taipei, with offices in Westborough, Massachusetts, and Portland, Oregon. The company's market capitalization of the company's common shares is currently around $115M.

Overview

The company's product portfolio includes InsydeH2O BIOS (Insyde Software's implementation of the Intel Platform Innovation Framework for UEFI/EFI), BlinkBoot, a UEFI-based boot loader for enabling Internet of Things devices, and Supervyse, which is a full-featured systems management/BMC firmware  providing out-of-band remote management for server computers.

Insyde Software was formed when it purchased the BIOS assets of SystemSoft Corporation (NASDAQ:SYSF) in October, 1998.  Initially 
Insyde Software was a privately held company that included investment from Intel Pacific Inc., China Development Industrial Bank, Professional Computer Technology Limited (PCT), company management and selected employees. At that time, Insyde Software's management team consisted of Jeremy Wang, Chairman (also the Chairman of PCT); Jonathan Joseph, President (a former founder of SystemSoft); Hansen Liou, the General Manager of Taiwan Operations and Asia-Pacific Sales, and Stephen Gentile, the Vice President of Marketing.

Shortly after the initial investment, the company was introduced by Intel to a new BIOS coding architecture called EFI (now UEFI) and the two companies began working together on it. In 2001, the two companies entered into a joint development agreement and Insyde’s first shipment of the technology occurred in October 2003 as InsydeH2O UEFI BIOS. Since that time, UEFI has become the mainstay of Insyde’s business.

On 23 January 2003, Insyde Software announced its initial public offering on the GreTai Securities Market (GTSM) based in Taipei, Taiwan.

Products

InsydeH2O UEFI BIOS

The product is a proprietary licensed UEFI BIOS firmware that supports Intel and AMD. PC manufacturers buy the BIOS source code and modify the source code to meet their specific BIOS needs. For the firmware's security vulnerabilities, the company publishes the security advisory, and provides the updates on the CVE fixes and patches to their customers.

See also
 List of companies of Taiwan
 BIOS features comparison

References 

Software companies established in 1998
BIOS
Software companies of Taiwan
Companies based in Taipei
Electronics companies of Taiwan
Taiwanese brands
Taiwanese companies established in 1998
2003 initial public offerings
Companies listed on the Taipei Exchange